The S class are a class of diesel locomotives built by Clyde Engineering, Granville for the Victorian Railways between 1957 and 1961.

History
The S class was based on the Electro-Motive Diesel F7 design and were very similar to the GM12 class then being built by Clyde Engineering for the Commonwealth Railways. They were mechanically similar to the 1952 built double ended B class.

The first order for 10 locomotives were progressively delivered between August 1957 and February 1958. The first four took the names and numbers of the recently scrapped S class steam locomotives, with all being named after prominent Victorians. An additional eight locomotives were ordered for use on the new North East standard gauge line and delivered between November 1960 and December 1961.

The class were initially used on express passenger trains such as the Intercapital Daylight, Southern Aurora, Spirit of Progress and The Overland, but were also used on fast freights. On the broad gauge, they often operated in pairs, while on the standard gauge they usually ran solo. A second 'hostlers' cab was provided at the number two end, but was only used around depots, or to haul empty carriages short distances.

In February 1969, two were destroyed in the Violet Town railway disaster, and were deemed uneconomical to repair and scrapped. In January 1967 S317 was badly damaged in a head-on collision with X33 south of Broadford Loop and was returned to Clyde Engineering for rebuilding. In June 1982, S317 was again involved in a fatal accident when it ran into the rear of the Spirit of Progress at Barnawartha, killing the crew.

As more modern locomotives were introduced, those on the standard gauge moved to the broad gauge. Examples would periodically appear on the standard gauge.

When the G Class engines entered service, the railways declared that no more S Class engines would undergo major overhauls. The last two had been S301 in 1985 and S307 in 1986; as of July 1987, engines S303, 304, 305 and 309 were withdrawn, 308 banned as a leading unit and 306 was under minor repair but still in the VR Blue livery. In February 1994, four (300, 302, 311, 312) were sold to West Coast Railway for use on their Melbourne to Warrnambool passenger service. By April 1999, only four remained in the V/Line fleet and even these were only used during periods of high demand. A few have been preserved.

Privatisation brought an upturn in the class' fortunes with some overhauled and as at May 2014, they remain in service with CFCL Australia, Pacific National and Southern Shorthaul Railroad. In 2019, S300 and S311 were purchased privately from CFCLA. S311 was purchased from its private owner by SSR in mid 2020 and was promptly returned to service, still on standard gauge operating primarily in NSW. Pacific National sold S307 to the Seymour Railway Heritage Centre on 17 March 2023.

Fleet status

Photo Gallery

Model Railways

HO scale
The S Class was one of the first plastic, ready-to-run model railway locomotives made specifically to cater to the Victorian market. An initial release by Lima in 1976 recycled their 44 Class body shell with a paint scheme roughly resembling that of the Victorian Railways.

Also in the 1970s, Tyco produced a repainted version of their EMD F9 with the Victorian Railways livery and numbered S301, which was a unique road number for a Tyco model. With the model being an F-unit, it is shorter than an S class and only has four-wheeled bogies, although the Tyco bogies used on the model were actually six-wheeled designs with elongated sideframes to approximate the Blomberg design for the F-unit. As the locomotive had American-style X2F horn hook couplers however, it was not compatible with other Australian rolling stock without modification, as most Australian models at the time used NEM hook and loop couplers (for example Lima) or Hornby tension lock couplers.

In 1977, Hornby modified their B/L Class design to create their approximation of the S Class engine, this time with the rounded bulldog nose. The model, which was marketed through 1977–1978, was released as either S311 or S315 with product code R.317. The model utilised the then-standard Silver Seal Ringfield motor, and around 12,000 units were produced, mostly in sets.

To compete with the Hornby model, Lima invested in a proper body mould for the S Class design, released in 1981 as S302 and S315. This model was re-released on multiple occasions, and eventually in V/line orange (S310) and West Coast Railway blue (S302). With more accurate models being released in the decades since, original Lima models are regularly repurposed as parts donors or for merging into fictional engines, i.e. a non-driving "SB" class.

In October 1991, VR Models released a series of name and number plates which could be used on any of the earlier releases.

Also in the early 1990s, Precision Scale Models imported a range of VR Blue and V/Line orange brass locomotives.

Finally, in November 2009, TrainOrama released a modern-quality take on the S Class locomotive. The engine featured a five-pole skew-wound motor, pickup from all wheels (and all powered), and no rubber tyres; twin flywheels; directional headlights and marker lights, and a range of other details. Engines were sold individually, with an RRP of $285.00.

The first batch included models of S300, S301, S303, S306, S308, S311, S312, S313, S315 and S317 in VR Blue, S309 and S310 in V/Line Orange, and S303 in Freight Australia Green. Some of the blue engines were in the earlier format, with fuel tank valences and nose doors; others had the valences removed and the nose doors welded shut.

In mid-2016, Bobs Hobbies, now the owner of TrainOrama, announced a re-release of the S Class engines, with new numbers. The price rose to $295.00 per unit, and the range now includes S304, S305 and S313 in blue and S308 and S312 in orange.

To date, no models have been released of S307, S314, or S316.

N Scale
In 1984, Weico released a kit that could be used to construct either a NSW 42 Class or VR S Class locomotive.
In 2018, Gopher Models introduced ready-to-run models of the NSW 42 class, the CR GM-12 class and the VR S class in a variety of liveries.

References

Further reading

External links

Clyde Engineering locomotives
Co-Co locomotives
Pacific National diesel locomotives
Railway locomotives introduced in 1957
S class
Standard gauge locomotives of Australia
Broad gauge locomotives in Australia
Diesel-electric locomotives of Australia
Streamlined diesel locomotives